Federal elections were held in Switzerland on 19 October 2003. Although in Switzerland's political system, in which all four major parties form a coalition, it is very difficult to achieve a change of government, this election produced an upset with the strong showing of the right-wing, anti-European Union and anti-immigration Swiss People's Party. The left-wing parties, the Social Democrats and the Greens, also improved their positions. The losers were the parties of the centre and centre-right, the Christian Democratic People's Party and the Free Democratic Party.

In the aftermath of the elections Ruth Metzler-Arnold, one of the two Christian Democrats in the Federal Council was replaced by Christoph Blocher, the most influential politician in the Swiss People's Party.

Electoral system
Switzerland has a bicameral legislature, the Federal Assembly (Assemblée Fédérale / Bundesversammlung / Asamblea Federale / Assemblea Federala).
The National Council (Conseil National / Nationalrat / Consiglio Nazionale / Cussegl Naziunal) has 200 members, elected for four-year terms by proportional representation in multi-member constituencies corresponding to the 26 Swiss cantons and half-cantons.
The Council of States (Conseil des Etats / Ständerat / Consiglio degli Stati / Cussegl dals Stadis) has 46 members elected for four-year terms from multi-member and single-member constituencies.

These elections were to the National Council and for most of the members of the Council of States.

All parties in Switzerland have different names in French, German and Italian, and conduct separate campaigns in the different language areas.

Results

National Council

By constituency

Council of the States

See also
2003 Swiss Federal Council election

References

Bibliography

External links
Official voting results 

Federal elections in Switzerland
2003 elections in Switzerland
October 2003 events in Europe